Nambo Station is a railway station located in Bantar Jati, Klapanunggal, Bogor Regency. Together with three other stations located on this line, it was only inaugurated in 1997, which makes it one of the newest station in the network. This plan had to be postponed due to the 1997 economic crisis. 

To fill the empty route, PT Kereta Api Indonesia (Indonesian Railway Company) operated DMU (KRD) Tanah Abang-Nambo line in 2002. This route only lasted until 2006 due to the very old rolling stock and large number of ticketless passengers that caused PT KAI's revenue leakage. 

In 2012, PT KAI began to reactivate this railway line. This 12.6 km line was also electrified in order to let trains from Jakarta Commuter Line service run from Citayam branch. 

Since 4 December 2013, PT KAI launched a freight train for cement transportation from Nambo to Kalimas Station [id] in Surabaya, East Java. In its development, the train route was then extended to Ketapang. As of 1 April 2015, this station has served the KRL Commuterline for the Nambo-/ route ten times a day.

Building and layout 

This station has eight train lines with line 1 being a straight line to the Gunung Putri Station, while to the east of line 2 is a buffer stop as the rail's end point. Line 1 is used for boarding and alighting KRL Commuterline passengers, while lines 2 to 8 are used for the storage of cement transport.

Services
The following is a list of train services at the Nambo Station

Passenger services 
 KAI Commuter
  Bogor Line (Nambo branch), to

Freight
 KAI Logistik
 Coal to 

Supporting transportation

Gallery

References

External links
 

Bogor Regency
Railway stations in West Java
Railway stations opened in 1997